Euzophera decaryella is a species of snout moth in the genus Euzophera. It was described by Hubert Marion and Pierre Viette in 1956, and is known from Madagascar.

References

Moths described in 1956
Phycitini
Moths of Madagascar